Clube Atlético Penapolense, commonly referred to as Penapolense, is a professional association football club based in Penápolis, São Paulo, Brazil. It competes in the Campeonato Paulista Segunda Divisão, the fourth tier of the São Paulo state football league.

The club's home colours are red and blue and the team mascot is a panther.

History
The club was founded on November 16, 1944, ten years after two local clubs, named Esporte Clube Corinthians and Penápolis Futebol Clube, folded. The club was founded after a Penápolis combined team played a friendly game in Fernandópolis against a local combined team. Penapolense won the Campeonato Paulista Série A3 in 2011.

Current squad

Out on loan

Achievements
Campeonato Paulista Série A3
 Winners (1): 2011

Campeonato Paulista do Interior
 Winners (1): 2014

Stadium
Clube Atlético Penapolense play their home games at Estádio Municipal Tenente Carriço, nicknamed Tenentão. The stadium has a maximum capacity of 5,717 people.

References

 
Association football clubs established in 1944
Football clubs in São Paulo (state)